Fisherton is a small coastal hamlet, overlooking the Moray Firth, and  situated 3 miles northeast of Inverness in Inverness-shire, Scottish Highlands and is in the Scottish council area of Highland.

References

Populated places in Inverness committee area